Tania Hermida (b. 1968) is an Ecuadorian movie director and screenwriter. She wrote and directed the internationally recognized and lauded films Qué tan lejos and In the Name of the Girl and has collaborated with other filmmakers, like Sebastián Cordero. From 2007 to 2008, she was a member of the Ecuadorian National Assembly.

Biography
Tania Hermida was born in Cuenca, Ecuador in 1968. Her father, a doctor and an avid reader, ensured that Hermida grew up surrounded by art and literature. When she was nine, her family devised a familial newspaper called Horizontes wherein each member of the family wrote a page.

Following after her father, Hermida studied medicine for a single year, but decided that it was not her vocation. At 19, she discovered a scholarship course in film hosted at the International School of Film and TV at San Antonio de los Baños, Cuba, and decided to apply. She won the scholarship and, in 1991, graduated from the school. Though her father had admired the Cuban Revolution and promoted it in the Hermida household and instilled in Tania a respect for Cuba, she became fascinated with the ways that the people of Cuba expressed their dissatisfaction with the Communist government. Her first film, 11 minutes in length, was about a Cuban plastic artist who used his talents to creatively criticize the government.

Hermida completed complementary studies in the aesthetics of cinema at the University of Valladolid in 1990 and creative writing at the School of Letters in Madrid in 1998.

Citations

Living people
1968 births
People from Cuenca, Ecuador
Ecuadorian film directors
Members of the National Congress (Ecuador)